Anne Ferrell Tata is an American politician who is a member of the Virginia House of Delegates from the 82nd district. Elected in November 2021, she assumed office in January 2022.

Early life and education 
Tata was born in the Walter Reed Army Medical Center in Washington, D.C. Tata's father was a chaplain in the United States Army, and the family moved frequently around the United States and Europe during her childhood. Tata earned a Bachelor of Arts degree in communication and media studies from Florida State University.

Career 
Early in her career, Tata worked as a medical sales representative. She has also been a political fundraiser. She was elected to the Virginia House of Delegates in November 2021 and assumed office in January 2022.

Personal life 
Tata's father-in-law was Bob Tata, a former member of the Virginia House of Delegates from the 85th district. Anne Ferrell is married to Robert Tata and they have four children.

References 

Living people
Florida State University alumni
People from Virginia Beach, Virginia
Women state legislators in Virginia
Republican Party members of the Virginia House of Delegates
Year of birth missing (living people)
21st-century American women